Bridgestone Tower is an American skyscraper in Nashville, Tennessee located at 200 4th Avenue South. It stands 140 meters (460 ft) and has 30 floors. It was designed by Perkins+Will and was finished in 2017. The building serves as the headquarters of Bridgestone Americas, a subsidiary of Bridgestone, the global tire and rubber manufacturer. Throughout 2017, Bridgestone Americas consolidated many of their business units into a single building, housing nearly 2,000 employees. The tower is nestled between the Country Music Hall of Fame and the Schermerhorn Symphony Center, and is only a few hundred feet from Bridgestone's namesake NHL facility, Bridgestone Arena.

See also
List of tallest buildings in Nashville

References

Bridgestone
Skyscrapers in Nashville, Tennessee
Office buildings in Nashville, Tennessee
Office buildings completed in 2017